A Tour in Scotland, 1769 was published in 1771. It is written by Thomas Pennant and illustrated by Moses Griffiths, who travelled together.

Pennant set a new standard in travel literature: Samuel Johnson (whose own travelogue it provoked) said of him, "He's the best traveller I ever read; he observes more things than anyone else does".

He himself said of his work: "I beg to be considered not as a Topographer but as a curious traveller willing to collect all that a traveller may be supposed to do in his voyage; I am the first that attempted travels at home, therefore earnestly wish for accuracy."(May 1773).

Pennant was a naturalist, and many of his observations were of the flora and fauna; but he also wrote about other subjects, including  economics and what would now be considered anthropology.

Besides its effect on travel writing, the work had an effect on the shifting national identities of the time.

References

External sources
A Tour in Scotland, 1769 fulltext at the Internet Archive (published 1771; the tour described was in 1769).

1769 books
18th century in Scotland
British travel books
Books about Scotland
Hebrides
1760s in Scotland
Welsh non-fiction books